The 2011 CFL Draft took place on Sunday, May 8, 2011 at 12:30 PM ET on TSN. 47 players were chosen from among eligible players from Canadian Universities across the country, as well as Canadian players playing in the NCAA. The Toronto Argonauts, Montreal Alouettes and Hamilton Tiger-Cats had the most draft selections with a total of seven apiece. Next came the Calgary Stampeders and Winnipeg Blue Bombers who each had six selections. The BC Lions and Saskatchewan Roughriders both picked five times. The Edmonton Eskimos had the fewest picks, with only four. A total of five trades involving 14 draft picks were made on the draft day itself. Of the 47 draft selections, 34 players were drafted from Canadian Interuniversity Sport institutions.

Top prospects 
Source: CFL Scouting Bureau final rankings.

Trades
In the explanations below, (D) denotes trades that took place during the draft, while (PD) indicates trades completed pre-draft.

Round one
 BC → Calgary (D). BC traded this selection, the 26th overall pick and the 34th overall pick in this year's draft to Calgary for the sixth overall pick, the 11th overall pick and the 37th overall pick.
 Toronto → Winnipeg (PD). Toronto traded this selection and a conditional fourth round pick in the 2012 CFL Draft to Winnipeg for Steven Jyles.
 Hamilton → Edmonton (D). Hamilton traded this selection and the rights to Zipp Duncan to Edmonton for the 10th overall pick and the 13th overall pick in this year's draft.
 Calgary → BC (D). Calgary traded this selection, the 11th overall pick and the 37th overall pick in this year's draft to BC for the third overall pick, the 26th overall pick and the 34th overall pick.
 Saskatchewan → Toronto (D). Saskatchewan traded this selection to Toronto for the 12th overall pick and the 27th overall pick in this year's draft.

Round two
 Winnipeg → Calgary (PD). Winnipeg traded this selection to Calgary for defensive back Lenny Walls.
 Edmonton → Hamilton (D). Edmonton traded this selection and the 13th overall pick in this year's draft to Hamilton for the fifth overall pick and the rights to Zipp Duncan.
 BC → Calgary (PD). BC traded this selection and a conditional fourth-round pick in the 2012 CFL Draft to Calgary for Jesse Newman.
 Calgary → BC (D). Calgary traded this selection, the sixth overall pick and the 37th overall pick in this year's draft to BC for the third overall pick, the 26th overall pick and the 34th overall pick.
 Toronto → Saskatchewan (D). Toronto traded this selection and the 27th overall pick in this year's draft to Saskatchewan for the seventh overall pick.
 Hamilton → Edmonton (PD). Hamilton traded this selection and the rights to Dalin Tollestrup to Edmonton for Justin Medlock, Carlos Thomas, a third round pick in the 2011 draft, and a fifth round pick in the 2011 draft.
 Edmonton → Hamilton (D). Edmonton traded this selection and the 10th overall pick in this year's draft to Hamilton for the fifth overall pick and the rights to Zipp Duncan.
 Calgary → Edmonton (D). Calgary traded this selection to Calgary for the rights to Brian Bulcke.

Round three
 Edmonton → Hamilton (PD). Edmonton traded this selection, a 2011 fifth round selection, Justin Medlock and Carlos Thomas to Hamilton for a 2011 second round pick and the rights to Dalin Tollestrup.
 Hamilton → Toronto (PD). Hamilton traded this selection, a 2010 third-round selection, and the rights to prospect Corey Mace to Toronto for Arland Bruce III.
 Toronto → Saskatchewan (PD). Toronto traded this selection, T. J. Acree, and the rights to Brian Smith to Saskatchewan for Ronald Flemons and a 5th round pick in the 2011 draft.
 Saskatchewan → Hamilton (PD). Saskatchewan traded this selection, Adam Nicolson, and an unnamed player from Saskatchewan's negotiation list to Hamilton for Prechae Rodriguez.
 Saskatchewan → Toronto (PD). Saskatchewan traded this selection to Toronto for Michael Bishop.

Round four
 Toronto → Montreal (PD). Toronto traded this selection to Montreal for Chad Owens.
 BC → Calgary (D). BC traded this selection, the third overall pick and the 34th overall pick in this year's draft to Calgary for the sixth overall pick, the 11th overall pick and the 37th overall pick.
 Toronto → Saskatchewan (D). Toronto traded this selection and the 12th overall pick in this year's draft to Saskatchewan for the seventh overall pick.
 Hamilton → Toronto (PD). Hamilton traded this selection and a conditional 2013 draft selection to Toronto for Brian Ramsay.

Round five
 Winnipeg → Edmonton (PD). Winnipeg traded this selection to Edmonton for the rights to Kelly Butler.
 Edmonton → Winnipeg (PD). Edmonton traded this selection and a 6th round pick in the 2011 draft to Winnipeg for Taylor Inglis.
 Edmonton → Hamilton (PD). Edmonton traded this selection, a 2011 third round selection, Justin Medlock and Carlos Thomas to Hamilton for a 2011 second round pick and the rights to Dalin Tollestrup.
 BC → Calgary (D). BC traded this selection, the third overall pick and the 26th overall pick in this year's draft to Calgary for the sixth overall pick, the 11th overall pick and the 37th overall pick.
 Calgary → BC (D). Calgary traded this selection, the sixth overall pick and the 11th overall pick in this year's draft to BC for the third overall pick, the 26th overall pick and the 34th overall pick.
 Saskatchewan → Toronto (PD). Saskatchewan traded this selection and Ronald Flemons to Toronto for T. J. Acree, the rights to Brian Smith, and a 3rd round pick in the 2011 draft.

Round six
 Winnipeg → Saskatchewan (PD). Winnipeg traded this selection to Saskatchewan for James Johnson.
 Edmonton → Winnipeg (PD). Edmonton traded this selection and a 5th round pick in the 2011 draft to Winnipeg for Taylor Inglis.
 Saskatchewan → Edmonton (D). Saskatchewan traded this selection to Edmonton for Graeme Bell.

Forfeitures
 Calgary forfeited their third round selection after selecting Johnny Forzani in the 2010 Supplemental Draft.

Draft order

Round one

Round two

Round three

Round four

Round five

Round six

References

Canadian College Draft
Cfl Draft, 2011